2013 PDC-E is a fictitious near-Earth object developed by Don Yeomans and others as the target of a table top emergency response drill at the International Academy of Astronautics  2013 Planetary Defense Conference.  The drill was intended to give astronomers and other experts in asteroid and comet impact studies practice in responding to a hypothetical imminent impact with global consequences.

The name 2013 PDC-E is a parody on minor planet naming conventions, PDC for Planetary Defense Conference, -E for exercise.

It is notionally a 300-meter-diameter stony asteroid that is part of the Aten dynamical family in 2013, when it is hypothetically observed by the Pan-STARRS telescope at a magnitude of 22.5. It migrates to the Apollo dynamical family over time. 2013 PDC-E is predicted in the exercise to pass through a dynamical keyhole of 1.2 km diameter in 2023 with a probability of 8%. If it did, it would strike Earth in 2028 with an impact velocity of 12.4 km/s, and an impact energy of approximately 700 megatons.

The exercise featured a hit on the French Riviera. It was repeated with different targets and conditions:

 2015 Dhaka
 2017 Tokyo
 2019 New York City

References 

Hypothetical bodies of the Solar System
Fictional astronomical objects
Disaster preparedness
Recurring events established in 2013